Fabio Roselli (born 15 December 1983) is an Italian professional footballer who plays for Calcio Lecco 1912.

He played one game in the Serie A in the 2005-06 season for Treviso F.C. 1993.

References

External links
 
 
 

1983 births
Living people
Italian footballers
Serie A players
Serie B players
S.P.A.L. players
S.S. Arezzo players
Treviso F.B.C. 1993 players
A.C. Legnano players
Ravenna F.C. players
Cosenza Calcio players
U.S. Alessandria Calcio 1912 players
F.C. Matera players
Association football midfielders